USS George Bancroft (SSBN-643), a  (or "640-class") fleet ballistic missile submarine, was the fourth ship of the United States Navy to be named in honor of George Bancroft (1800-1891), United States Secretary of the Navy (1845–1846) and the founder of the United States Naval Academy.

Construction and commissioning
The contract to build George Bancroft was awarded to the Electric Boat Division of General Dynamics Corporation in Groton, Connecticut, on 1 November 1962 and her keel was laid down there on 24 August 1963.  She was launched on 20 March 1965, sponsored by Mrs. Jean B. Langdon, great, great-granddaughter of Secretary Bancroft, and Mrs. Anita C. Irvine, his great, great, great-granddaughter, and commissioned on 22 January 1966, with  Captain Joseph Williams in command of the Blue Crew and Commander Walter M. Douglass in command of the Gold Crew.

Service history
George Bancroft was assigned to Submarine Squadron 14 of Submarine Flotilla 6 with New London, Connecticut, as her home port. Her first deployment began with her departure from New London on her first deterrent patrol on 26 July 1966, manned by the Blue Crew. Soon after she successfully completed the patrol with her arrival at Holy Loch, Scotland, the Gold Crew relieved the Blue Crew. A few weeks later, George Bancroft got underway for her second deterrent patrol, manned by the Gold Crew, which ended toward the close of the year. Early in 1967, George Bancroft began her third deterrent patrol, manned by the Blue Crew.

History needed for 1967-1993.

Decommissioning and disposal
George Bancroft was decommissioned on 21 September 1993 and stricken from the Naval Vessel Register the same day. Her scrapping via the Nuclear-Powered Ship and Submarine Recycling Program at Bremerton, Washington, was completed on 30 March 1998.

Commemoration
George Bancrofts sail is on display at Naval Submarine Base Kings Bay, Georgia.

Notes

References

External links
Map: 

 

Ships built in Groton, Connecticut
Benjamin Franklin-class submarines
Cold War submarines of the United States
Nuclear submarines of the United States Navy
1965 ships